Shamu's Deep Sea Adventures is a video game linked to SeaWorld's popular Shamu orca shows. The game was released in November 2005 and is available for GameCube, Game Boy Advance, Nintendo DS, PlayStation 2, and Xbox.

Story
In the game, Poseidon, the Greek god of the sea, tries to destroy the SeaWorld theme park and replace it with Atlantis.  The player controls Shamu, the titular protagonist, who attempts to defeat Poseidon and the Kraken.  Shamu collects power ups and performs various feats over 20 levels and 8 environments.

Reception

The PlayStation 2 and Xbox versions received "mixed" reviews, while the GameCube and DS versions received "unfavorable" reviews, according to the review aggregation website Metacritic.

Xbox Advanced said, "Shamu’s Deep Sea Adventures is just flat out a bad game. Being a budget title does not save this game or excuse any of its shortcomings, as so many of today’s budget titles for kids are actually very good".  The video game columnist for CiN Weekly said the game is "a cute marketing vehicle that is too difficult and underdeveloped for its target audience".

References

External links
Official site
Microsoft Xbox's site for Shamu's Deep Sea Adventures

2005 video games
Game Boy Advance games
Nintendo DS games
GameCube games
PlayStation 2 games
Xbox games
SeaWorld Parks & Entertainment
Video games developed in Romania
Video games set in amusement parks
Video games with underwater settings
Fiction about whales
Fun Labs games
Works based on amusement park attractions